Chae Gwang-hoon (born 17 August 1993), is a South Korean football player who currently plays for Seoul E-Land FC.

Career

He made his debut over Gangwon FC on 30 April 2016, coming on for Goo Dae-Young. 

He scored his first goal for Anyang against Jeonnam Dragons on 11 August 2019.

He joined Gangwon FC in 2020.

In February 2021, he joined Gyeongnam FC.

In January 2022, he joined Seoul E-Land FC.

References

External links

Living people
1993 births
Association football defenders
FC Anyang players
Gangwon FC players
Gyeongnam FC players
Seoul E-Land FC players
South Korean footballers